Ethmia cellicoma is a moth in the family Depressariidae. It is found in Paraguay.

The ground color of the forewings is whitish gray, although the costal edge is whitish toward the middle. The ground color of the hindwings is white, the apex suffused with pale gray.

References

Moths described in 1931
cellicoma